Mycetagroicus inflatus is an ant species which was discovered in 2005 by R.R. Silva and R. Feitosa in Brazil, and described by Brandao and Mayhe-Nunes in 2008.

References

Myrmicinae
Insects described in 2008